Upsilon Librae (υ Lib, υ Librae) is the Bayer designation for a double star in the zodiac constellation Libra. With an apparent visual magnitude of 3.628, it is visible to the naked eye. The distance to this star, based upon an annual parallax shift of 14.58, is around 224 light years. It has a magnitude 10.8 companion at an angular separation of 2.0 arc seconds along a position angle of 151°, as of 2002.

The brighter component is an evolved K-type giant star with a stellar classification of K3 III. At the estimated distance of the star, this yields a physical size of about 31.5 times the radius of the Sun. It has 1.67 times the mass of the Sun and radiates 309 times the solar luminosity from its outer atmosphere at an effective temperature of 4,135 K. The star is about three billion years old.

In around 2.3 million years, Upsilon Librae will be the brightest star in the night sky, and will peak in brightness with an apparent magnitude of –0.46.

References

K-type giants
Double stars
Libra (constellation)
Librae, Upsilon
CD-27 10464
Librae, 39
139063
076470
5794